Ignacio "Nacho" Martín Gómez (born 19 March 2002) is a Spanish professional footballer who plays as a midfielder for Sporting de Gijón B.

Club career
Born in Noreña, Asturias, Martín joined Sporting de Gijón's Mareo from Condal CF. He made his senior debut with the reserves on 17 October 2020, starting in a 4–2 Segunda División B home loss against Cultural y Deportiva Leonesa.

On 1 July 2021, Martín renewed his contract with the Rojiblancos and was definitely promoted to the B-team. He made his first team debut on 7 October 2022, coming on as a late substitute for Pol Valentín in a 3–1 home win over Villarreal CF B in the Segunda División.

References

External links

2002 births
Living people
People from Oviedo (Asturian comarca)
Spanish footballers
Footballers from Asturias
Association football midfielders
Segunda División players
Segunda División B players
Tercera Federación players
Sporting de Gijón B players
Sporting de Gijón players